Declan Hannon (born 25 November 1992) is an Irish hurler who plays for Limerick Senior Championship club Adare and at inter-county level as captain of the Limerick senior hurling team, whom he captained to the All Ireland hurling title in 2018, 2020, 2021 and 2022 becoming the first Limerick captain since Mick Mackey to captain Limerick to victory twice, and the first hurling captain to lift the Liam MacCarthy Cup a record four times. He usually lines out as a centre-back.

Early life

Hannon attended Scoil Naomh Iosaf, an all boys school situated in the village of Adare. Hurling was a pillar of the education system in the school, pushed by two Tipperary men, Brother Cathal Duane (Kilruane) and Principal Barry O'Riordan (Nenagh).
Hannon was born in Adare, County Limerick. His granduncle, Pat Stakelum, captained Tipperary to the All-Ireland title in 1949.

Playing career

Ardscoil Rís

Hannon first came to prominence as a hurler with Ardscoil Rís in Limerick. Having played in every grade as a hurler, he was centre-back on the college's senior hurling team. On 11 March 2010, Hannon scored three points from play when Ardscoil Rís defeated Thurles CBS in the final of the Harty Cup.

On 27 February 2011, Hannon was again at centre-back when Ardscoil Rís retained the Harty Cup title after a 3-19 to 0-03 defeat of C.B.S. Charleville in the final.

Mary Immaculate College

During his studies at Mary Immaculate College, Hannon was selected for the college's senior hurling team. On 27 February 2016, he won a Fitzgibbon Cup medal as Mary I won their first ever title after a 1-30 to 3-22 defeat of the University of Limerick after two periods of extra-time. Hannon, in spite of being substituted in the 79th minute and ending as the game's top scorer, said: "That was one of the most unbelievable games I have played in. We had it won and lost so many times throughout the game, but we’d have stayed until midnight to win."

Adare

Hannon joined the Adare club at a young age and played in all grades at juvenile and underage levels. He enjoyed championship success in the under-14 and under-16 grades before making his championship debut with the club's senior team as a sixteen-year-old. On 18 October 2009, Hannon scored three points from right wing-forward when Adare defeated Na Piarsaigh by 1-17 to 0-03 in the final of the Limerick Senior Championship.

Limerick

Minor and under-21

Hannon first played for Limerick at minor level. He made his first appearance on 25 June 2010 in a 1-17 to 2-12 defeat by Clare in the Munster Championship.

Hannon subsequently joined the Limerick under-21 hurling team. On 3 August 2011, he scored 1-04 from play when Limerick defeated Cork by 4-20 to 1-27 in the final of the Munster Championship.

Senior

On 17 April 2010, Hannon made his senior debut at right wing-forward for Limerick in a National League defeat of Antrim at Loughguile. He later won a National League Division 2 medal after a 4-12 to 2-13 defeat of Clare in the final.

On 14 July 2013, Hannon was at full-forward in Limerick's 0-24 to 0-15 defeat of Cork in the Munster final.

Hannon's performances during the 2011 and 2014 seasons earned him All-Star nominations.

In December 2017, Hannon was appointed captain of the Limerick senior hurling team for the 2018 season. On 19 August 2018, he scored two points from play and captained Limerick to their first All-Ireland title in 45 years after a 3-16 to 2-18 defeat of Galway in the final. Later that day Hannon was named on The Sunday Game Team of the Year. He ended the season by winning an All-Star Award.

On 31 March 2019, Hannon was selected at centre-back for Limerick's National League final meeting with Waterford at Croke Park. He collected a winners' medal and the cup after contributing with a point in the 1-24 to 0-19 victory. On 30 June 2019, Hannon won his first Munster Championship medal in six years after captaining Limerick to a 2-26 to 2-14 defeat of Tipperary in the final.

Hannon won a second successive National League medal on 25 October 2020, after captaining Limerick to a 0-36 to 1-23 defeat of Clare in the delayed 2020 league final. On 15 November 2020, he won a third Munster Championship medal after captaining Limerick to a 0-25 to 0-21 win over Waterford in the final. Hannon was the first Limerick player since Mick Mackey to captain the team to two provincial title successes.

Hannon entered the history books in 2022 when he became the first hurling captain to lift the Liam MacCarthy Cup on four occasions.

Munster

On 19 February 2012, Hannon was an unused substitute in Munster's 3-14 to 1-16 Railway Cup semi-final defeat by Leinster.

Career statistics

Honours

Ardscoil Rís
Harty Cup (2): 2010, 2011

Mary Immaculate College
Fitzgibbon Cup (1): 2016

Adare
Limerick Senior Hurling Championship (1): 2009
Limerick Senior Football Championship (3):  2017, 2018, 2020
Limerick Intermediate Football Championship (1): 2016

Limerick
All-Ireland Senior Hurling Championship (4): 2018 (c), 2020 (c), 2021 (c), 2022 (c)
Munster Senior Hurling Championship (5): 2013, 2019 (c), 2020 (c), 2021 (c), 2022 (c)
National Hurling League (2): 2019 (c), 2020 (c)
National Hurling League Division 2 (1): 2011
Munster Senior Hurling League (2): 2018 (c), 2020 (c)
Waterford Crystal Cup (1): 2015
Munster Under-21 Hurling Championship (1): 2011

Awards
All-Star Award (3): 2018, 2021, 2022
The Sunday Game Team of the Year (3): 2018, 2021, 2022

References

1992 births
Living people
Adare hurlers
Limerick inter-county hurlers
Munster inter-provincial hurlers
Hurling backs
People educated at Ardscoil Rís, Limerick
Alumni of Mary Immaculate College, Limerick
All Stars Awards winners (hurling)